Odonteleotris is a small genus of fishes in the family Butidae native to tropical marine waters of the western Pacific Ocean and fresh and brackish waters of southern Asia.

Species
The recognized species in this genus are:
 Odonteleotris canina (Bleeker, 1849)
 Odonteleotris macrodon (Bleeker, 1853) (Gangetic sleeper)
 Odonteleotris polylepis (Herre, 1927)

References

Butidae